Weberbauera is a genus of flowering plants in the crucifer family Brassicaceae, native to the central Andes; Peru, Chile, Bolivia, and Argentina.

The genus has simple or branched trichomes, basal leaves with petioles which are linear to oblanceolate or oblong, relatively elongated stems with or without cauline leaves, inflorescences which are ebracteate or basally bracteate racemes which are longer than basal leaves, and seeds without mucilage. The fruit are curved or straight siliques which are torulose or not.

It is quite similar in fruit and flower to Zuloagocardamum and Chilocardamum.

Species
Currently accepted species include:

Weberbauera arequipa Al-Shehbaz & Montesinos
Weberbauera ayacuchoensis Al-Shehbaz, A.Cano & Trinidad
Weberbauera bracteata (O.E.Schulz) J.F.Macbr.
Weberbauera chillanensis (Phil.) Al-Shehbaz
Weberbauera colchaguensis (Barnéoud) Al-Shehbaz
Weberbauera cymosa Al-Shehbaz
Weberbauera densifolia Al-Shehbaz
Weberbauera dillonii Al-Shehbaz
Weberbauera herzogii (O.E.Schulz) Al-Shehbaz
Weberbauera imbricatifolia (Barnéoud) Al-Shehbaz
Weberbauera incisa Al-Shehbaz, P. Gonzáles & A. Cano
Weberbauera lagunae (O.E.Schulz) Al-Shehbaz
Weberbauera minutipila Al-Shehbaz
Weberbauera orophila  (Wedd.) Salariato &. Al-Shehbaz
Weberbauera perforata Al-Shehbaz
Weberbauera peruviana (DC.) Al-Shehbaz
Weberbauera retropila Al-Shehbaz
Weberbauera rosulans (O.E.Schulz) Al-Shehbaz
Weberbauera scabrifolia Al-Shehbaz
Weberbauera smithii Al-Shehbaz
Weberbauera spathulifolia (A.Gray) O.E.Schulz
Weberbauera stenophylla (Leyb.) Al-Shehbaz
Weberbauera suffruticosa (Barnéoud) Al-Shehbaz
Weberbauera trichocarpa (Muschl.) J.F.Macbr.
Weberbauera violacea Al-Shehbaz

References 

Brassicaceae
Brassicaceae genera